Dialectic of Enlightenment is a work of philosophy and social criticism written by Frankfurt School philosophers Max Horkheimer and Theodor W. Adorno. The text, published in 1947, is a revised version of what the authors originally had circulated among friends and colleagues in 1944 under the title of Philosophical Fragments.

One of the core texts of critical theory, Dialectic of Enlightenment explores the socio-psychological status quo that had been responsible for what the Frankfurt School considered the failure of the Age of Enlightenment. Together with Adorno's The Authoritarian Personality (1950) and fellow Frankfurt School member Herbert Marcuse's One-Dimensional Man (1964), it has had a major effect on 20th-century philosophy, sociology, culture, and politics, especially inspiring the New Left of the 1960s and 1970s.

Historical context

One of the distinguishing characteristics of the new critical theory, as Adorno and Horkheimer set out to elaborate it in Dialectic of Enlightenment, is a certain ambivalence concerning the ultimate source or foundation of social domination. 

Such would give rise to the "pessimism" of the new critical theory over the possibility of human emancipation and freedom. Furthermore, this ambivalence was rooted in the historical circumstances in which Dialectic of Enlightenment was originally produced: the authors saw National Socialism, Stalinism, state capitalism, and culture industry as entirely new forms of social domination that could not be adequately explained within the terms of traditional theory.

For Adorno and Horkheimer (relying on the economist Friedrich Pollock's thesis on National Socialism), state intervention in the economy had effectively abolished the tension in capitalism between the "relations of production" and the "material productive forces of society," a tension that, according to traditional theory, constituted the primary contradiction within capitalism. The market (as an "unconscious" mechanism for the distribution of goods) had been replaced by centralized planning.

Because of this, contrary to Marx's famous prediction in his preface to A Contribution to the Critique of Political Economy, this shift did not lead to "an era of social revolution," but rather to fascism and totalitarianism. As such, traditional theory was left, in Jürgen Habermas' words, without "anything in reserve to which it might appeal; and when the forces of production enter into a baneful symbiosis with the relations of production that they were supposed to blow wide open, there is no longer any dynamism upon which critique could base its hope." For Adorno and Horkheimer, this posed the problem of how to account for the apparent persistence of domination in the absence of the very contradiction that, according to traditional critical theory, was the source of domination itself.

Topics and themes

The problems posed by the rise of fascism with the demise of the liberal state and the market (together with the failure of a social revolution to materialize in its wake) constitute the theoretical and historical perspective that frames the overall argument of the book—the two theses that "Myth is already enlightenment, and enlightenment reverts to mythology."  

The history of human societies, as well as that of the formation of individual ego or self, is re-evaluated from the standpoint of what Horkheimer and Adorno perceived at the time as the ultimate outcome of this history: the collapse or "regression" of reason, with the rise of National Socialism, into something (referred to as merely "enlightenment" for the majority of the text) resembling the very forms of superstition and myth out of which reason had supposedly emerged as a result of historical progress or development.

Horkheimer and Adorno believe that in the process of "enlightenment," modern philosophy had become over-rationalized and an instrument of technocracy. They characterize the peak of this process as positivism, referring to both the logical positivism of the Vienna Circle and broader trends that they saw in continuity with this movement. Horkheimer and Adorno's critique of positivism has been criticized as too broad; they are particularly critiqued for interpreting Ludwig Wittgenstein as a positivist—at the time only his Tractatus Logico-Philosophicus had been published, not his later works—and for failing to examine critiques of positivism from within analytic philosophy.

To characterize this history, Horkheimer and Adorno draw on a wide variety of material, including the philosophical anthropology contained in Marx's early writings, centered on the notion of "labor;" Nietzsche's genealogy of morality, and the emergence of conscience through the renunciation of the will to power; Freud's account in Totem and Taboo of the emergence of civilization and law in murder of the primordial father; and ethnological research on magic and rituals in primitive societies; as well as myth criticism, philology, and literary analysis.

The authors coined the term culture industry, arguing that in a capitalist society, mass culture is akin to a factory producing standardized cultural goods—films, radio programmes, magazines, etc. These homogenized cultural products are used to manipulate mass society into docility and passivity. The introduction of the radio, a mass medium, no longer permits its listener any mechanism of reply, as was the case with the telephone. Instead, listeners are not subjects anymore but passive receptacles exposed "in authoritarian fashion to the same programs put out by different stations."

By associating the Enlightenment and Totalitarianism with Marquis de Sade's works—especially Juliette, in excursus II—the text also contributes to the pathologization of sadomasochist desires, as discussed by historian of sexuality Alison Moore.

Editions
The book made its first appearance in 1944 under the title Philosophische Fragmente by Social Studies Association, Inc. (New York). Dialektik der Aufklärung (Dialectic of Enlightenment) was published as a revised version in 1947 by Querido Verlag (Amsterdam). It was reissued in 1969 by S. Fischer Verlag.

There have been two English translations: the first by John Cumming (New York: Herder and Herder, 1972); and a more recent translation, based on the definitive text from Horkheimer's collected works, by Edmund Jephcott (Stanford: Stanford University Press, 2002).

See also
 Counter-Enlightenment
 Das Kapital

Notes

External links

"The Culture Industry: Enlightenment as Mass Deception." Excerpt of Chapter 1 of The Dialectic of Enlightenment, transcribed by A. Blunden [1998] 2005.
"Dialectic of Enlightenment," in the Stanford Encyclopedia of Philosophy.

1944 non-fiction books
1947 non-fiction books
Age of Enlightenment
Critical theory
Frankfurt School
German non-fiction books
Marxist books
New Left
Works by Max Horkheimer
Works by Theodor W. Adorno
Criticism of rationalism